The following is a list of Khazar rulers.

Early Khazar rulers

Khazar Khagans (Ashina dynasty)

The Khagans were supreme chiefs of the people, holding positions of much influence and spiritual authority, but with little day-to-day command.

Khazar Beks
The Khagan Beks were war chiefs, military commanders who exercised considerable day-to-day authority, and were sometimes regarded by outsiders as the supreme lords of the Khazar nation.

Conversion to Judaism
Hazer Tarkhan's army was annihilated at Itil in 737 AD, and the Umayyad Caliphate imposed Islam upon the Khazars. Nevertheless, the Caliphs could not adequately garrison Khazaria, and within a few years the Khazars were once again independent. The famous conversion to Judaism seems to have occurred about this time. The date of the actual conversion to Judaism is a matter of some controversy. According to Yehuda Halevi in Kuzari, it occurred around 740 AD, though some Arab sources point to a date closer to the end of the 8th century or early 9th century, and more recent scholars have postulated that 861 AD, the date of St. Cyril's visit to Khazaria, was the year of the conversion to Judaism.

The 2002 discovery of a coin hoard in Sweden further complicates the issue, as some of the coins bear dates from the early 9th century and the legends "Ard al-Khazar" (Land of the Khazars) and  "Moses is the Prophet of God". Since the coins date from 837 AD or 838 AD, some scholars think the conversion occurred in 838 AD. Bulan Sabriel was the Khazar ruler at the time of the conversion, but in the list below all the dates up to Aaron I are based on a presumed 740 AD conversion date.

Bulanid dynasty

Late Khazar Rulers
In 969 AD, Sviatoslav I of Kiev sacked Itil, the capital of the Khazar Khaganate. Khazar successor states appear to have survived in the Caucasus and around the Black Sea. We know of two later Khazar rulers:

Collapse of Khazar power
Georgius Tzul was captured by a joint Rus'-Byzantine expedition and his state was destroyed. Shortly thereafter, the Kipchaks became masters of the Pontic steppe (see Cumans). However, there continue to be tantalizing references, in Muslim sources, of battles against "Khazars" in the Caucasus well into the late 11th century. Whether Khazar states continued to survive or their name was used generically to describe Caucasian highlanders is unclear.

The fate of the Jewish Khazars is unclear. Jewish travelers of the 12th century continue to refer to them in passing. Khazar Jews are known to have lived in Kiev and even to have emigrated to Spain, the Byzantine Empire and Iraq. According to some sources the majority may have gone to Hungary, Poland and the Crimea, mingling with Jews in those areas and with later waves of Jewish immigrants from the west.

Sources

Artamonov, Mikhail. Istoriya Khazar. Leningrad, 1962.
Brook, K.A. The Jews of Khazaria. 2nd ed. Rowman & Littlefield Publishers, Inc, 2006.
Christian, David. A History of Russia, Mongolia and Central Asia. Blackwell, 1999.
Golden, Peter Benjamin. Introduction to the History of the Turkic Peoples. Wiesbaden: Harrasowitz, 1992.
Golden, Peter Benjamin. Nomads and Sedentary Societies in Medieval Eurasia. Washington, D.C.: American Historical Society, 1998.
Klyashtorny, S.G. and T.I. Sultanov. Kazakhstan. Alma-Ata, 1992.
Mango, C. & R. Scott (trans.), The Chronicle of Theophanes Confessor, Oxford University Press, 1997.

Khazar
Khazars